William Storey may refer to:

 W. A. Storey (William A. Storey, 1854–1917), mayor of Portland, Oregon, U.S. 1899–1900
 William Benson Storey (1857–1940), president of the Atchison, Topeka and Santa Fe Railway, United States
 William John Storey, British businessman

See also
William Story (disambiguation)